The Priory of Saint-Marcel-lès-Chalon, earlier the Abbey of Saint-Marcel-lès-Chalon, was a monastery located in the present commune of Saint-Marcel near Chalon-sur-Saône, Saône-et-Loire, eastern France. It was founded in  590 as a Benedictine abbey. Somewhere between 979 and 988 it became part of the Congregation of Cluny, when it became a priory, like most Cluniac houses.

The philosopher Peter Abelard died here in 1142. The priory was suppressed during the French Revolution: the monastic buildings were demolished but the church survives as a parish church.

References

Saint-Marcel-les-Chalon
Saint-Marcel-les-Chalon
Buildings and structures in Saône-et-Loire